The IEEE Haraden Pratt Award was established by the IEEE Board of Directors in 1971.  This award is presented to recognize individuals who have rendered outstanding service to the IEEE.

This award is presented to an IEEE Senior Member or Fellow.

Following people received the IEEE Haraden Pratt Award:

Recipients

References 

IEEE awards
Awards established in 1971
Haraden Pratt Award